Champagnier is a commune in the Isère department in southeastern France.

Population

See also
Communes of the Isère department

References

External links

Official site

Communes of Isère